Mario Guillermo Desbordes Jiménez (born 15 October 1968) is a Chilean politician and former police officer of Carabineros de Chile. He became the Minister of Defense in July 2020.

Desbordes previously served as a member of the Chamber of Deputies in Congress and was the president of National Renewal from 2018 to 2020. He also held the position of Secretary-General of his political party from 2010 to 2018 and was Undersecretary of Investigations during President Sebastián Piñera's first administration.

Known for his "social right-wing" project, Desbordes played a key role in the agreement for a plebiscite towards a new constitution to replace the 1980 Constitution in 2019. After the agreement, he announced to the press that he would vote "Approve" for a new constitution in the entry plebiscite held on October 25, 2020. However, two years later, he chose the "Reject" option in the exit plebiscite due to his dissatisfaction with the proposal from the Constitutional Convention.

In July 2021, Desbordes finished last in a four-way primary for the Chile Vamos coalition, ending his bid for the presidency.

Biography

Early life
Born in 1968, Desbordes spent part of his childhood in Los Andes, his native town. Then, he moved to Santiago, Chile's capital city, where he lived in La Cisterna commune until 1986. He completed his elementary school education at E–556 public school of that commune, and finished the high school at A–109 Lycée in El Bosque commune.

Political career

In 2000, he joined to his party: Renovación Nacional (RN; National Renewal).

Piñera's first term: 2010–2014
In 2010, Desbordes became RN's General Secretary after a caretaker period of Cecilia Pérez, who replaced him until he finished his services as Undersecretary of Invesgation on 23 November.

Piñera's second term: 2018–2022
On 9 January 2020, he participated on a seminar about characteristics and the future of the Chilean right-wing alongside Jacqueline van Rysselberghe and Hernán Larraín Matte.

On 12 March 2020, it was reported by Interferencia newspaper that Desbordes received threats from libertarian far–right leader Sebastián Izquierdo, who called him as a «coward rightist».

On 28 July 2020, he resigned to his charge of deputy after accepting the proposal of the President Piñera about appointing him as Minister of Defense of Chile.

On 23 January 2021, he was proclaimed by his party as candidate for the primaries presidential elections of the coalition. On 18 July, he was defeated after finishing in the last place (fourth) behind Ignacio Briones (Evópoli), Joaquín Lavín (UDI) and Sebastián Sichel (Independent).

Political thought
He has declared being a socialchristian rightist and having as his references to the socialchristianism of Angela Merkel and the politics of the Spanish Popular Party.

On more than one occasion he has been critical to the subsidiary positions from allies or key leaders of the party Independent Democratic Union («UDI»), like ―for example― the independent economist Cristián Larroulet or the senator van Rysselberghe (UDI). According to French sociologist Stéphanie Alenda, the reason of these frictions have relation with the «solidarity» endorsed by Desbordes' social right. These differences have stirred up criticism from politicians of his own party like Carlos Larraín and Andrés Allamand, both from RN's conservative factions which have opined that Desbordes would leading to the party towards left-wing politics because two reasons: 1) his support to a new constitution, and 2) his coincidence with positions of the Humanist Party respect to the retirement of AFP's 10% funds.

One of Desbordes'  intellectual referents is the philosopher Hugo Eduardo Herrera, who ―however― doesn't recognize himself as his theoretical.

Personal life
He is fan of Colo-Colo, most successful team in the history of football in Chile.

References

External links
 Profile at Biblioteca del Congreso Nacional de Chile

1968 births
Living people
Chilean people
Chilean people of French descent
Chilean politicians
National Renewal (Chile) politicians
Chilean Ministers of Defense